Catocala musmi is a moth of the family Erebidae first described by George Hampson in 1913. It is found in China and Korea.

References

External links
"Species name Catocala musmi". Digital Moths of Asia.

musmi
Moths of Asia
Moths described in 1913